Nailia Galiamova (born 26 March 1961 in Tashkent, Uzbekistan) is a composer, living and working in Vilnius, Lithuania.

Biography 
Galiamova studied piano and composition at the Vladislav Uspensky Secondary Music School by the Tashkent State Conservatoire from 1968 until 1979. From 1979 to 1984 she studied composition under the tutelage of Prof. Albert Leman at the Piotr Tchaikovsky State Conservatoire in Moscow, which she graduated with distinction. She furthered composition studies in postgraduate program from 1984 until 1989.

In 1984 she married Lithuanian trumpeter Algirdas Januševičius and in 1985 gave birth to her son Gintaras. In 1987 the family moved to Klaipėda, Lithuania. There Galiamova was a faculty member of the choral conducting department of Klaipėda Branch of the Lithuanian State Conservatoire. In 1993 the family, already including their 1-year-old daughter Donata, moved to Vilnius. Since 1994 she has served as a supervisor of the record library at the Mikalojus Konstantinas Čiurlionis School of Arts, and has taught music analysis, orchestration, polyphony and composition.

Performances 
Galiamova's works were performed in various concerts, competitions and festivals in Tashkent, Moscow, St.Petersburg, Vilnius and other cities. In 1985 and 1987 All-Union students' and postgraduates' competitions her Piano Concerto was awarded first and Cello Sonata second prize.

In addition to large-scale instrumental compositions Nailia Galiamova has written pieces for piano and strings, songs and romances for soloists and choirs, and music for children. She chooses traditional genres, moderate stylistics (displaying features of neo-classicism and minimalism) and tonal harmonic language. The composer has made orchestral arrangements of a number of works by various composers for the Lithuanian State Symphony Orchestra, Lithuanian Chamber Orchestra, and St.Christopher Chamber Orchestra among others.

List of Works

Orchestra
 1984 "Concerto" for piano and orchestra
 1988 "Symphonic Dances" for bassoon and orchestra

Choir
 1983 "Svirel zapela" on the verses by Alexander Blok for mixed choir a cappella
 2009 "Forest Bells" on the text by Ramutė Skučaitė for children's choir and piano

Chamber ensemble
 1984 "Sonata" for cello and piano
 1985 "Chorales" for two pianos
 2007 "Spell" for two pianos
 2012 "Skomorokh" for flute and tambourine
 2012 "City Hall Fanfares" for two trumpets and trombone
 2013-2014 "Les rêves parisiens" for soprano, oboe, bassoon and piano

Voice and piano (another instrument)
 1979 "Lullaby" on the verses by Afanasy Fet for soprano and flute
 1979 "Three Romances" on the verses by Maximilian Voloshin for voice and piano
 1981 "Four Romances" on the verses by Vahan Terian for mezzo-soprano and piano
 1983 "In the Kingdom of Pale Moon" on the verses by Konstantin Balmont for soprano and piano
 1986 Four Sketches for the short story of Takahasi "Season of Butterflies" on the text by Mitsuko Takahasi for soprano and chamber ensemble
 2011 "Fairy's Tales" on the verses by Konstantin Balmont for soprano and piano

Instrument solo
 1982 "Musical Moment" for piano
 1990 "Sonata in C" for piano
 1999 "Prelude and Toccata" for piano
 2003 "Snowflakes Behind the Window" for piano
 2003 "Your Turn to Catch" for piano
 2003 "Two Cyborgs Angry at Each Other" for piano
 2003 "Three Japanese Dolls Greet Each Other" for piano
 2003 "How Do Honey Cakes Disappear" for piano
 2003 "Lullaby" for piano
 2003 "Polyphonic Notebook" for piano
 2006 "Allusio" for trumpet
 2009 "A Tale of a White Ox" for piano

References

External links 
 Music Export Lithuania

1961 births
Living people
Musicians from Tashkent
20th-century classical composers
Uzbekistani composers
Lithuanian classical composers
Soviet women composers
Academic staff of the Lithuanian Academy of Music and Theatre
Musicians from Vilnius
Women classical composers
Uzbekistani people of Tatar descent
Lithuanian people of Uzbekistani descent
20th-century women composers
Musicians from Klaipėda